Hermina is a female given name. Notable people with the name include:

 Hermina Franks (1914-2010), pitcher who played in the All-American Girls Professional Baseball League
 Hermina Geyser (born 1938), South African athlete
 Hermina Laukotová (1853-1931), Czech painter, graphic artist, and art teacher
 Grada Hermina Marius (1854-1919), Dutch writer and painter
 Hermina Morita (born 1954), adviser for the Hawaii State House Committee on Finance
 Hermina Pipinić (1928-2020), Croatian actress
 Bartha Hermina Tollius (1780-1847), Dutch amateur pastellist
 Hermína Týrlová (1900-1993), Czech animator, screenwriter, and film director

See also
 Herminia (given name)
 Mina (given name)

Hermina